The Smithfield team was a minor league baseball team based in Smithfield, Utah. In 1921, the Smithfield team played as a charter member of the Class D level Northern Utah League. The team moniker was noted to be the "Blue Sox."

History
Smithfield became a charter member when the Northern Utah League first began play in the 1921 season. The Northern Utah League began the 1921 season as a six–team Class D level minor league. The Northern Utah League's charter franchises were based in Brigham City, Utah (Brigham City "Peaches"), Lewiston, Idaho (Lewiston Broncs), Logan, Utah (Logan Collegians), Ogden, Utah (Ogden) and Tremonton, Utah (Tremonton) joined Smithfield, in the newly formed league.

The 1921 Smithfield team using the "Blue Sox" moniker, corresponds with local semi–professional and collegiate summer baseball teams continually using the moniker every season since beginning play in the 1890s.

Smithfield began Northern Utah League began play on May 4, 1921, as the league played a split season schedule. The second half began on July 4, 1921. The six–team league overall standings in database references consisted of Brigham City (7–9), the Lewiston Broncs (4–11), Logan Collegians (8–9), Ogden (11–5), Smithfield (6–10) and Tremonton (12–4). With their 12–4 record, Tremonton had the best record in the league. It was reported that Tremonton finished 15–5 in the second half standings to again finish in 1st place in the standings.

Records conflict, but reports in the "1921 Northern Utah League Summary" by Ray Olson, the league secretary, have Smithfiled finishing in 2nd place in the first half of the season and in 5th place in the second half. Olson's report has the Brigham City "Peaches" winning the first half with a 12–4 records and Smithfield in 2nd place, 1.0 game behind with an 11–5 record. Reportedly, Tremonton won the second half, beating Ogden in a three–game playoff series after the two clubs finished the season tied for first place with 15–5 records. Smithfield was 8.0 games behind with a 7–13 record. In a five–game series for the league title, the Brigham City Peaches reportedly defeated the Tremonton "Bears" 3 games to 2. Smithfield's overall record as reported in the league summary was 18–18.

On June 11, 1921, Smithfield turned a triple play in a game against the Logan Collegians.

The Northern Utah League permanently folded as a minor league following the 1921 season.

Smithfield, Utah has not hosted another minor league team.

Richard V. Hansen Ballpark
The Richard V. Hansen Ballpark is located at Forrester Acres 500 W 100 N, Smithfield Utah. A statue of Richard Hansen can be seen on the East side of the park. Richard Hansen served as manager/coach of the Blue Sox for 47 years, and over 2,500 games. Hansen received multiple awards from his community for his service to the Blue Sox's and was inducted into the U.S. Open Baseball Hall of Fame. Hansen managed his 2,500th game on May 9, 2009, during Smithfield City Health Days. In 2009 he celebrated his 60th year with the team and 47 year as manager. In his 47 years of coaching the team, he only missed six games. Hansen passed away on January 21, 2010. In honor of his relentless and untiring service to the Smithfield Blue Sox the Richard V. Hansen Award has been awarded annually since 2010 to a person who has done all they could for the Blue Sox organization. 

A memorial to Nyals Bodine, Steven Smith, and Dale Anderson can also be found on the East side of the park near the Blue Sox dugout.  

In 2021 the crows nest was renamed the "Steven Smith Crows Nest" in memory of Steven Smith.   

The ballpark has also become known for its "Lion Pups". Starting in 1953 instead of serving hot dogs the food stand decided to serve corn dogs. Ruth S. Hansen, an avid member of Lions Clubs International and mother of Richard Hansen said "We should call them Lion Pups." The name has stuck ever since. Originally a Lion Pup only cost 5 cents. They are traditional served with a secret sauce, many believe it to be a concoction of ketchup and mustard. The food stand, also known as the "Lions stand" and is sponsored by the Smithfield Lions Club.

Year–by–year records

Notable alumni

 Robert Thomas Kaiser: Played 5 games with the Cleveland Indians in their 1971 season. He went on to play for the Blue Sox in 1974.
 Lewis Albert Fonseca: Played for the Smithfield Summits in 1920. He went straight to the major leagues playing with the Cincinnati Reds (1921-1924), the Phillies (1925), the Cleveland Indians (1927-1931), and the Chicago White Sox (1931-1933). Fonseca also won the American League Batting Title in 1929.

References

External links
Baseball Reference

Defunct minor league baseball teams
Sports teams in Utah
Baseball teams established in 1921
Baseball teams disestablished in 1921
1921 establishments in Utah
Defunct baseball teams in Utah
Professional baseball teams in Utah
Northern Utah League teams
Cache County, Utah